Allan In Wonderland is an album by Allan Sherman, released by Warner Brothers Records.

Track listing

Side One
 "Skin" ("Heart" from Damn Yankees)
 "Lotsa Luck" ("Badinage" by Victor Herbert)
 "Green Stamps" ("Green Eyes")
 "Holiday For States" ("Holiday for Strings")
 "You Need An Analyst" ("I've Got a Little List" from The Mikado)
 "The Drop-Outs March" ("The Notre Dame March")

Side Two
 "I Can't Dance" (Grieg's Norwegian Dance Number 2.)
 "Night And Day" (With Punctuation Marks)
 "Little Butterball" ("Little Buttercup")
 "Good Advice"

References

1964 albums
Allan Sherman albums
Warner Records albums
1960s comedy albums